How It Feels to Be Something On is the third studio album by American rock band Sunny Day Real Estate, and the first following their 1997 reunion. It was released September 8, 1998.

Reissue
In 2016, Sub Pop announced that they would reissue How It Feels to Be Something On on different audio formats. It was officially released on August 5, 2016 and has led to renewed interest in the record, including an official Pitchfork 2016 re-review. The album peaked at number 7 on the Billboard Vinyl Albums chart.

Track listing

Personnel

Band
 Jeremy Enigk – lead vocals, rhythm guitar, keyboards
 Dan Hoerner – lead guitar, backing vocals
 Jeff Palmer – bass
 William Goldsmith – drums, percussion

Production
Nick Barber
Caleb Wilson – track supervisor
Chip Butters – assistant engineer, assistant
Greg Calbi – mastering
Steve Culp – assistant engineer, assistant
Eric Janko – assistant engineer, assistant
Adam Kasper – mixing
Pat Sample – mixing assistant, assistant
Chris Thompson – artwork
Aaron Warner – assistant engineer, assistant
Greg Williamson – producer, engineer, mixing

Charts

References

1998 albums
Sunny Day Real Estate albums
Sub Pop albums
Albums recorded at Robert Lang Studios